Lanelater substriatus is a species of click beetle belonging to the family Elateridae.

Description

Distribution
This species can be found in Sierra Leone, Senegal, Guinea, Democratic Republic of Congo and São Tomé Island.

References
 Universal Biological Indexer
 Organism Names
 Gwannon
 Synopsis of the described Coleoptera of the World
 E Fleutiaux (1902)  Descriptions de quatre espèces nouvelles du genre Agrypnus Bulletin de la Société Entomologique de France 1902

Elateridae
Beetles described in 1857